Carlos Nahuel Roselli (born 14 April 1985, in Mar del Plata) is an Argentine football defender who plays for CD Círculo.

Career
Roselli began his playing career in 2005 with home town club Kimberley of the Argentine regionalised 4th division. In 2006, he joined another Mar del Plata team; Club Atlético Aldosivi of the 2nd division. He played there until 2009.

Roselli was given his chance to play in the Primera División when he was signed by Newell's Old Boys. He made his debut for the club on 3 October 2009 in a 3–0 home win against Atlético Tucumán.

References

External links
 
 BDFA profile 
 Argentine Primera statistics at Futbol XXI 

1985 births
Living people
Sportspeople from Mar del Plata
Argentine footballers
Association football defenders
Aldosivi footballers
Newell's Old Boys footballers
Quilmes Atlético Club footballers
Atlético Tucumán footballers
Talleres de Córdoba footballers
Argentine Primera División players